Hearing level is the sound pressure level produced by an audiometer at a specific frequency. It is measured in decibels with reference to audiometric zero. Hearing of speech is considered to be impaired   when the hearing level is shifted 25 dB or more.

References

Audiology